The Lola B99/50 is an open-wheel formula race car chassis developed by British manufacturer Lola, for use in the International Formula 3000 series, a feeder-series for Formula One, between 1999 to 2001, until it was replaced by the new Lola B02/50 chassis for the new in 2002.

Background

The car was conceived as the only car admitted to the International Formula 3000 starting from the 1999 season. She was employed for three seasons in that championship (until 2001), before being replaced by the Lola B02/50. Subsequently, in 2002, it was introduced in the Euro Formula 3000 championship. It was used exclusively until 2004, to then be joined with the more modern Lola B02/50. A separate classification was reserved for riders using the old chassis. It was also used in the 3000 Pro Series in 2005 and 2006.

Currently, together with the most recent model, the Lola B02/50, it is used in uphill speed races at the Italian and European level; in constant struggle with the FA-30 single-seater of the Italian manufacturer Osella Corse.

Final year specifications 
Compression ratio: 13.6:1
Bore: 
Stroke: 
Engine weight: 
Fuel delivery: Zytek Electronic-indirect fuel injection
Aspiration: Naturally-aspirated
Steering: Non-assisted rack and pinion

References 

Open wheel racing cars
International Formula 3000
Lola racing cars